Verticordia patens is a flowering plant in the myrtle family, Myrtaceae and is endemic to the south-west of Western Australia. It is a shrub with linear, pointed leaves and faintly scented, pale yellow flowers in open heads on the ends of the branches. It is fairly common in a small area south of Badgingarra.

Description

Flowering time is from September to November.

Taxonomy and naming
This species was first formally described by Alex George in 1966 and the description was published in Western Australian Naturalist. He collected the type specimen at Moore River. The specific epithet (patens) is a Latin word meaning "open" referring to the open branching habit of this species.

When he reviewed the genus in 1991, George placed this species in subgenus Chrysoma, section Chrysohoe along with V. nitens and V. nitens.

Distribution and habitat
This verticordia occurs in a small area between Badgingarra, Coorow and Moore River. It usually grows in sand or gravelly soil, sometimes over laterite or loam, in heath, shrubland or low woodland.

Conservation
Verticordia patens is classified as "not threatened" by the Western Australian Government Department of Parks and Wildlife. Although its range is limited, it is fairly common in that area, part of which includes a significant national park.

Use in horticulture
It possible to propagate V. patens from cuttings but the plant has proven difficult to maintain in the garden due to its susceptibility to fungal disease.

References

patens
Rosids of Western Australia
Eudicots of Western Australia
Plants described in 1966